Landsborough Tree is a heritage-listed tree at Burketown, Shire of Burke, Queensland, Australia. It was added to the Queensland Heritage Register on 21 August 1992.

History 
The Landsborough Tree marks the site by the Albert River where explorer William Landsborough established a depot camp while searching for the missing Burke and Wills expedition in 1862. He buried supplies near the eucalypt tree in case the explorers should come up upon it; he carved the word "Dig" into the tree.

The brig Firefly used in the search was abandoned nearby on the riverbank.

In December 2002, vandals set the tree alight, causing the trunk to fall over. In 2007, it was described as "nothing but a small charred stump", but by June 2009 there was a sapling "replanted" alongside the dead tree to replace it.

References

Attribution

External links 

Queensland Heritage Register
Burketown
Individual trees in Queensland
Articles incorporating text from the Queensland Heritage Register